The Frank–Wolfe algorithm is an iterative first-order optimization algorithm for constrained convex optimization. Also known as the conditional gradient method, reduced gradient algorithm and the convex combination algorithm, the method was originally proposed by Marguerite Frank and Philip Wolfe in 1956. In each iteration, the Frank–Wolfe algorithm considers a linear approximation of the objective function, and moves towards a minimizer of this linear function (taken over the same domain).

Problem statement

The Frank–Wolfe algorithm solves the optimization problem
Minimize 

Algorithm

Step 1.  Direction-finding subproblem: Find  solving
Minimize 
Subject to 
(Interpretation: Minimize the linear approximation of the problem given by the first-order Taylor approximation of  around  constrained to stay within .)

Step 2.

Step 3.  Update:  Let , let  and go to Step 1.

Properties
While competing methods such as gradient descent for constrained optimization require a projection step back to the feasible set in each iteration, the Frank–Wolfe algorithm only needs the solution of a linear problem over the same set in each iteration, and automatically stays in the feasible set.

The convergence of the Frank–Wolfe algorithm is sublinear in general: the error in the objective function to the optimum is  after k iterations, so long as the gradient is Lipschitz continuous with respect to some norm. The same convergence rate can also be shown if the sub-problems are only solved approximately.

The iterates of the algorithm can always be represented as a sparse convex combination of the extreme points of the feasible set, which has helped to the popularity of the algorithm for sparse greedy optimization in machine learning and signal processing problems, as well as for example the optimization of minimum–cost flows in transportation networks.

If the feasible set is given by a set of linear constraints, then the subproblem to be solved in each iteration becomes a linear program.

While the worst-case convergence rate with  can not be improved in general, faster convergence can be obtained for special problem classes, such as some strongly convex problems.

Lower bounds on the solution value, and primal-dual analysis

Since  is convex, for any two points  we have:

This also holds for the (unknown) optimal solution . That is, . The best lower bound with respect to a given point  is given by

The latter optimization problem is solved in every iteration of the Frank–Wolfe algorithm, therefore the solution  of the direction-finding subproblem of the -th iteration can be used to determine increasing lower bounds  during each iteration by setting  and

Such lower bounds on the unknown optimal value are important in practice because they can be used as a stopping criterion, and give an efficient certificate of the approximation quality in every iteration, since always .

Notes

Bibliography
 (Overview paper)
The Frank–Wolfe algorithm description
 .

External links
https://conditional-gradients.org/: a survey of Frank–Wolfe algorithms.
Marguerite Frank giving a personal account of the history of the algorithm

See also 
 Proximal gradient methods

Optimization algorithms and methods
Iterative methods
First order methods
Gradient methods